Basketball Ireland (BI) is the national governing body for the sport on the island of Ireland. Part of FIBA Europe, the European governing body, and of FIBA, the World governing body, BI is responsible for the promotion and administration of basketball throughout Ireland and for Irish international participation. The organisation was founded in 1945 as the Amateur Basketball Association of Ireland (ABAI). The name of the organisation changed from the original ABAI to the Irish Basketball Association (IBA) in 1980.

BI operates as a conduit with Government Departments, particularly the Department of Transport, Arts, Tourism & Sport who have significantly funded BI in the past. BI is also the main conduit for the Irish Sports Council who provide significant funding.

BI positions itself as a service centre for all levels of the game, facilitating all aspects of promoting and running the sport. At national level, BI acts under the direction of the Board of Basketball Ireland whose remit includes financial governance and business strategy formation. BI also supports the National Council, the body on which every facet of the sport is represented, which acts as the sport policy formation and activation centre of the sport. BI seeks to promote the game, in all its forms, to supporters and prospective supporters by emphasising the great attributes of basketball.

Competitions
National Leagues 

Cups

Other
Schools League and Cup
All-Ireland Club Championships (U14/U16 Boys and Girls)
National Area Intermediate Competition
College
Wheelchair

Senior national teams
In February 2010, Basketball Ireland deactivated both the senior men's and women's national teams due to a financial crisis within the organisation. The full effect of the financial crisis was a debt of €1.2m, which made the continued funding of the national program too much of a financial burden. In June 2014, it was announced that Basketball Ireland were readmitting the senior national teams to international play in 2015.

See also
Ireland men's national basketball team
Ireland women's national basketball team
Super League

References

External links 
 Basketball Ireland's official website
 Irish basketball at Eurobasket.com
 
 Ireland Senior Men's Squad Announced
 Ireland Senior Women's Squad Announced

Basketball governing bodies in Europe
Basketball in Ireland
1945 establishments in Ireland
Basketball
Organizations established in 1945